Bert Chaney Jr. (born January 26, 1928) is an American former politician who served in the Kansas State Senate and Kansas House of Representatives from 1967 to 1984.

Biography
Chaney was born in Coffeyville, Kansas, the 14th of 17 children. He taught at Hutchinson Community College for 32 years. In 1966, Chaney was elected to the Kansas House, taking office in January 1967 and serving for three terms. In 1972, he moved up to the State Senate, representing the 34th district for three terms until 1984, when he was defeated by Republican David Kerr.

Personal life
Chaney married Marilyn Johnson on April 4, 1958; the couple had 3 children.

References

1928 births
Living people
Democratic Party Kansas state senators
Democratic Party members of the Kansas House of Representatives
20th-century American politicians
Politicians from Hutchinson, Kansas
People from Coffeyville, Kansas